Kim Chung-tae may refer to:
 Kim Chung-tae (archer)
 Kim Chung-tae (gymnast)